Ksenija Voishal (born on 18 October 1994) is a Belarusian basketball player for Olimpia Grodno and the Belarusian national team, where she participated at the 2014 FIBA World Championship.

References

1994 births
Living people
Belarusian women's basketball players
Point guards
Sportspeople from Grodno
Shooting guards